The Infrastructure Sustainability Council is a company limited by guarantee which was formed by a group of industry professionals from engineering, environmental, planning, legal, financial and construction backgrounds working in both private and public organisations related to infrastructure.  It was founded as the Australian Green Infrastructure Council on 28 February 2008.  The current name became effective on 
4 April 2013.

See also
 Australian Research Institute for Environment and Sustainability
 CEEQUAL

References

Australian Green Infrastructure Council
 https://www.architectureanddesign.com.au/news/bpn/australian-green-infrastructure-council-launches-i#
 http://www.steel.com.au/~/media/Files/Build%20and%20Construction%20Technical%20Library/Documents/AGIC-ISRatingToolNov2012.ashx
 http://www.arup.com.au/media/Sustainability_and_Infrastructure_May_2012.pdf
 http://www.concretepavements.com.au/Documents/AGIC%20Infrastructure%20Sustainability%20Rating%20Scheme%20-%20Walters.pdf
 http://www.concretepavements.com.au/Documents/Antony%20Sprigg.pdf
 http://www.roadsonline.com.au/building-resilience-championing-sustainable-infrastructure/
 https://www.claytonutz.com/knowledge/2010/september/green-light-for-agic-s-sustainability-rating-scheme
 https://www.uts.edu.au/research-and-teaching/our-research/institute-sustainable-futures/our-research/cities-and-0
 http://www.greencareer.net.au/archived-news/agic-launches-infrastructure-sustainability-rating-
 https://www.thefifthestate.com.au/articles/green-infrastructure-council-to-launch-rating-tool-early-2012-conference-told/
 https://www.fullyloaded.com.au/logistics-news/1203/green-infrastructure-rating-system-launched
 https://sbenrc.com.au/app/uploads/2015/01/SBEnrc-Project-1.22-Sustainability-Performance-Assessment-Report-2014.pdf
 https://eprints.qut.edu.au/83865/
 http://www.ipaustralia.com.au/applicant/australian-green-infrastructure-council/trademarks/1208445/

Infrastructure Sustainability Council
 http://www.abr.business.gov.au/AbnHistory/View?id=53131329774
 https://sbenrc.com.au/app/uploads/2015/01/SBEnrc-Project-1.22-Sustainability-Performance-Assessment-Report-2014.pdf
 https://edgeenvironment.com/infrastructure-sustainability-rating-tool-materials-calculator-guidelines/
 https://www.be.unsw.edu.au/sustainable-infrastructure
 https://www.uts.edu.au/sites/default/files/Pilot%20Rating%20Tool%20Application_%20Stage%201%20Report.pdf

External links
 

Environmental organisations based in Australia
Sustainable building in Australia
Infrastructure in Australia
Organizations established in 2008